Murambinda Mission Hospital (MMH), is a hospital in Zimbabwe. The hospital, also known as Murambinda Hospital, is located in the town of Murambinda, Buhera District, Manicaland Province, in eastern Zimbabwe.

Overview
The hospital is a rural community hospital, under Ministry of Health owned and administered by the Sisters of the Little Company of Mary, under the endorsement and supervision of the Roman Catholic Archdiocese of Harare. It is administered by the Ministry of Health. A school of nursing that is affiliated and sits adjacent to the hospital is owned and administered by the same organization, under similar arrangements with the Roman Catholic Church and the government of Zimbabwe. The professional staff at the hospital includes: 4 physicians/surgeons, and a number of nurses and midwives.

History
The hospital was established in 1968, by the Sisters of the Little Company of Mary, under the auspices of the Roman Catholic Archdiocese of Harare. Technically the Government of Zimbabwe is expected to provide subsidies and financial assistance, although sometimes that assistance never comes.

Friends of Murambinda Hospital (FMH), a United Kingdom-registered NGO, assists in recruiting volunteer healthcare professionals and medical students to work on volunteer, part-time or full-time basis at the hospital.

See also
 Districts of Zimbabwe
 Provinces of Zimbabwe
 List of hospitals in Zimbabwe

References

External links
Website of Friends of Murambinda Hospital

Hospital buildings completed in 1968
Hospitals in Zimbabwe
Hospitals established in 1968
Buhera District
Buildings and structures in Manicaland Province